Shareef Zandani (1098–10 November 1215), also known as Nooruddin, was a Sufi saint in India. He was a successor to Maudood Chishti, 13th link in the Sufi silsila of the Chishti Order, and the peer of Usman Harooni.

He was born  in a city called Zandanah in Iraq and died on 10 November 1215.  He is buried in Kannauj, Uttar Pradesh, India.

Spiritual Lineage

The traditional silsila (spiritual lineage) of the Chishti order is as follows

Al-Ḥasan al-Baṣrī (d. 728, an early Persian Muslim theologian)
'Abdul Wāḥid Bin Zaid Abul Faḍl (d. 793, an early Sufi saint)
Fuḍayll ibn 'Iyāḍ Bin Mas'ūd Bin Bishr al-Tamīmī
Ibrāhīm bin Adham (a legendary early Sufi ascetic)
Ḥudhayfah al-Mar'ashī
Amīnuddīn Abū Ḥubayrah al-Baṣrī
Mumshād Dīnwarī Al Alawi
Abu Ishaq Shami chishti (d. 940, founder of the Chishti order proper)
Abu Abdaal Chishtī
Naseruddin Abu Muhammad Chishtī
Abu Yusuf Nasar-ud-Din Chishtī (d. 1067)
Qutab-ud-Din Maudood Chishtī (Abu Yusuf's son, d. 1139)
Haji Sharif Zindani (d. 1215CE, 612H)

References

Sources
 Haji Shareef. Chishtysabiree.com.

Iranian Sufi saints
Chishti Order
Indian Sufi saints
1098 births
1215 deaths
12th-century Indian monks
12th-century Indian philosophers
13th-century Indian Muslims
Indian Sunni Muslim scholars of Islam